Nosk may refer to:
 Nosk, Kerman
 Nosk, Razavi Khorasan
 Nosk, a boss in Hollow Knight